Site No. JF00-072 is a survey monument located at the quadripoint of Republic and Washington counties in Kansas and Jefferson and Thayer counties in Nebraska. The monument marks the intersection of the sixth principal meridian and its baseline, the 40th parallel north; it serves as the initial point of all land surveys in Kansas and Nebraska, as well as most of Wyoming and Colorado, and part of South Dakota. U.S. Deputy Surveyor Charles A. Manners set the monument in 1856. The monument was later buried under a county roadbed; it was unearthed and reburied twice before being dug up for good in 1986, though its middle section is now missing.

The monument was added to the National Register of Historic Places on June 19, 1987.

See also
 OKKAMO Tri-State Marker: monument on the Oklahoma-Kansas-Missouri tripoint
 Site No. RH00-062: monument marking the beginning of the Kansas-Nebraska land survey

References

External links

Monuments and memorials on the National Register of Historic Places in Kansas
Monuments and memorials on the National Register of Historic Places in Nebraska
Buildings and structures completed in 1856
Buildings and structures in Washington County, Kansas
Buildings and structures in Republic County, Kansas
Buildings and structures in Jefferson County, Nebraska
Buildings and structures in Thayer County, Nebraska
National Register of Historic Places in Washington County, Kansas
National Register of Historic Places in Republic County, Kansas
Historic surveying landmarks in the United States
Borders of Nebraska
Borders of Kansas
Boundary markers
1856 establishments in Kansas Territory
1856 establishments in Nebraska Territory